Everett is a city in Middlesex County, Massachusetts, United States, directly north of Boston, bordering the neighborhood of Charlestown. The population was 49,075 at the time of the 2020 United States Census.

Everett was the last city in the United States to have a bicameral legislature, which was composed of a seven-member Board of Aldermen and an eighteen-member Common Council. On November 8, 2011, the voters approved a new City Charter that changed the City Council to a unicameral body with eleven members – six ward councilors and five councilors-at-large. The new City Council was elected during the 2013 City Election.

History and Transportation
Everett was originally part of Charlestown, and later Malden. It separated from Malden in 1870.

In 1892, Everett changed from a town to a city. On December 13, 1892, Alonzo H. Evans defeated George E. Smith to become Everett's first Mayor. Landfill has expanded the Everett shoreline over the centuries. At some point between 1905 and 1912, it connected the mainland to what was formerly White Island in the Mystic River. The bridge of the Grand Junction Railroad was originally built using this island for part of the crossing.

The city was named after Edward Everett, who served as U.S. Representative, U.S. Senator, the 15th Governor of Massachusetts, Minister to Great Britain, and United States Secretary of State. He also served as President of Harvard University.

In 1971, Distrigas of Massachusetts began importing liquefied natural gas (LNG) at its Everett Marine Terminal in the Island End section of Everett. This terminal was the first of its kind in the country.

Everett's business district is focused on Broadway, with many businesses and restaurants along the route. Bus routes that run through Everett are 97, 99, 104, 105, 106, 109, 110, 111, and  112. Everett Square is a small bus-hub, with bus routes 104, 109, 110, 112 and 97, all served by MBTA. A bus lane exists on Broadway (MA-99), from Glendale Square (Ferry Street), to Sweetser Circle. The Everett City Hall, Everett Fire Department, Parlin Memorial Library, and a few health centers, businesses and restaurants are centered around Everett Square on Broadway, Norwood St and Chelsea St. Everett Stadium is also near the Square. Route 16 is just south of the Square, allowing quick access to a major highway. Besides Everett Square, Gateway Center just off Route 16 in Everett is a major retail shopping district, with big box stores like Target, The Home Depot, and Costco. While there are no subways stops, the nearest subway station is Wellington Station on the MBTA Orange Line subway system, which is located in the Revere Beach Parkway in nearby Medford. The MBTA Commuter Rail stop in Chelsea, and SL3 stop, is also located 250 feet out of the city's southern limits.

US-1, which provides highway access to Revere and north, and Boston and I-93, runs just east of the city, bordering the Woodlawn cemetery. 

On June 23, 2019, the Encore Boston Harbor casino (formerly called the Wynn Casino and Resort of Boston) opened on a 33-acre parcel of land along Broadway and the Mystic River in Everett, which had been previously used for industrial purposes. After a remediation process to clean the site, Wynn Resorts constructed Encore Boston as an integrated resort with a hotel, a harborwalk, restaurants, a casino, spa, retail outlets, and meeting and convention space. Public amenities along the year-round harborwalk include a picnic park, paths for bikers and pedestrians, viewing decks, waterfront dining and retail, a performance lawn, floral displays, and boat docks. Wynn Resorts described the $2.6 billion development as "the largest private single-phase construction project in the history of the Commonwealth of Massachusetts."

Everett has an increasing population as people are seeking new households near downtown Boston while not wanting to pay the higher prices of living now associated with surrounding municipalities, such as those in neighborhoods of Boston, Cambridge, or Somerville.

Geography

Everett is bordered by Malden on the north, Revere on the east, Chelsea on the southeast, Somerville and Medford on the west, and Boston and the Mystic River on the south at Charlestown. Everett is a major part of the Port of Boston.

Some of Everett's neighborhoods are Glendale, Woodlawn, the Village, and the Line. Glendale Park is the city's largest park.

Climate

In a typical year, Everett, Massachusetts temperatures fall below 50F° for 195 days per year. Annual precipitation is typically 44.2 inches per year (high in the US) and snow covers the ground 52 days per year or 14.2% of the year (high in the US). It may be helpful to understand the yearly precipitation by imagining 9 straight days of moderate rain per year. The humidity is below 60% for approximately 25.4 days or 7% of the year.

Demographics

As of the 2010 United States Census, there were 41,667 people, 15,435 households, and 9,554 families residing in the city. The racial makeup of the city was 53.6% Non-Hispanic Whites, 14.3% African American, 4.8% Asian, 0.4% Pacific Islander, 2% from other races, and 3.8% were multiracial. Hispanic or Latino of any race were 21.1% of the population (9.3% Salvadoran, 3.0% Puerto Rican, 1.1% Colombian, 1.1% Dominican, 1.0% Guatemalan, 0.8% Mexican). The city also has a large number of people of Brazilian and Italian descent. In 2010, 33% of the residents of Everett were born outside the United States. This percentage was around 11% in 1990.

There were 15,435 households, out of which 27.6% had children under the age of 18 living with them, 41.8% were married couples living together, 15.2% had a female householder with no husband present, and 38.1% were non-families. 31.3% of all households were made up of individuals, and 11.8% had someone living alone who was 65 years of age or older. The average household size was 2.45 and the average family size was 3.11.

The population was spread out, with 21.6% under the age of 18, 8.9% from 18 to 24, 34.8% from 25 to 44, 19.9% from 45 to 64, and 14.7% who were 65 years of age or older. The median age was 36 years. For every 100 females, there were 91 males. For every 100 females age 18 and over, there were 87.4 males.

The median income for a household in the city was $49,737. The median income for a family is $49,876. Males had a median income of $36,047 versus $30,764 for females. The per capita income for the city was $23,876. About 9.2% of families and 11.9% of the population were below the poverty line, including 16.9% of those under age 18 and 10.0% of those age 65 or over.

Government

Local
Everett has a mayor-council form of government, where the mayor serves a four-year term.  The Everett city council was  the last existing bicameral legislature in any American city, consisting of a Board of Aldermen and a Common Council.  As of November 8, 2011, it became a unicameral City Council.

Board of Aldermen
The Board of Aldermen consisted of seven members one from each of the City's six wards and one Alderman-at-Large. All Aldermen were elected citywide for a term of two years.

In addition to the duties they shared with the Common Council, the Board of Aldermen was the licensing authority in the City and approved licenses for motor dealers, second-hand dealers, awnings, lodging houses, junk dealers, pool tables, open-air parking lots, coin-operated devices, Lord's Day licenses, antique and precious metal dealers.

Common Council
The Common Council consisted of three members elected per ward for a total of eighteen members. The Common Council shared equal responsibility for most legislative actions with the exception of licensing and confirmation of most Mayoral appointees.

State
Everett is represented in the state legislature by officials elected from the following districts:
 Massachusetts Senate's Middlesex and Suffolk district
 Massachusetts House of Representatives' 28th Middlesex district

Voter party enrollment

Education

Everett has eight public schools, which include six elementary schools, five K–8 schools, and one high school, Everett High School. The city also has one Private K–8 school and had a private Catholic high school, Pope John XXIII High School, which was forced, due to financial difficulties, to close on May 31, 2019. Everett High School moved to its new location, at 100 Elm Street, beginning in the 2007–2008 school year.

Sites of interest
Part of the historic Revere Beach Parkway listed on the National Register of Historic Places, lies in Everett. 

On September 16, 2014, the Massachusetts Gaming Commission voted to approve Wynn Resorts' proposal for a $1.6 billion casino to be located in Everett. It is now owned and operated by Encore, named Encore Boston Harbor Resort, and opened on June 23, 2019. It is partially in  Boston.

Industries

The Mystic Generating Station has been producing electricity since the early twentieth century. It was built by Boston Edison and is now operated by Exelon. It has the largest capacity of any electrical plant in the state.

The Leavitt Corporation has been manufacturing its trademark Teddie Peanut Butter in the city since 1924.

Notable people
See also :Category:People from Everett, Massachusetts

 Belden Bly, member of the Massachusetts House of Representatives
 Pat Bradley, Arkansas basketball player and sports commentator
 Matthew W. Bullock, Everett High School sports star, Dartmouth and Harvard Law School graduate, pioneering football coach, state government appointed service and national leader in the Urban League and the Bahá'í Faith
 Vannevar Bush, engineer and head of the United States Office of Scientific Research and Development
 George Russell Callender, military official and author
 Walter Tenney Carleton, founding director of the NEC Corporation
 Walter Carrington, US Ambassador to Nigeria & Senegal
 Benjamin Castleman, pathologist and namesake of Castleman's disease
 Lewis Cine, football player for the Minnesota Vikings
 Patricia Courtney, All-American Girls Professional Baseball League player
 Arthur Dearborn, Olympic track and field athlete
 Johnny Dell Isola, former National Football League player
 Louis DeLuca, member of the Connecticut Senate
 Omar Easy, NFL football player
 Maddy English, All-American Girls Professional Baseball League player
 Diamond Ferri, CFL & NFL player
 Hub Hart, MLB catcher
 Pat Hughes, NFL player
 Brian Kelly, LSU head football coach
 John P. Kennedy, Member of the Massachusetts House of Representatives 
 George Keverian, Speaker of the Massachusetts House of Representatives

 Rob Mello Actor,writer, director, U.S. Marine
 Torbert Macdonald, member of the United States House of Representatives
 Hermon Atkins MacNeil, sculptor
 Mary Eliza Mahoney, first African American to study and work as a professionally trained nurse in the United States (not from Everett but is buried there)
 A. David Mazzone, judge and attorney
 George J. Mead, aircraft engineer
 Gertrude Nason, artist
 Nerlens Noel, Oklahoma City Thunder center
 Andrew "Swede" Oberlander, College Football Hall of Famer
 Al Pierotti, football, baseball, pro wrestling
 Ellen Pompeo, actress
 Dan Ross, NFL player 
 Danny Silva, MLB player, Boston Celtics assistant coach, WWI and WWII veteran, longtime Everett teacher and coach
 Paul L. Smith, actor
 Jim Tozzi, member of the PFFR art collective responsible for Adult Swim shows like Wonder Showzen, Xavier: Renegade Angel, and The Shivering Truth
 Joseph Frank Wehner, fighter pilot during World War I
 Derek Perretti, notable fire captain of the Everett Fire Dep.
 John Brogner, Also known as "John David Conti", is a Everett born actor who worked in many shows and movies.

In popular culture
 Everett was home to the set of the 2012 ABC series Boston's Finest.
 The 2007 Ben Affleck film Gone Baby Gone was partially filmed and set in Everett.
 The old Everett High School was used for the filming of scenes for the Adam Sandler movie That's My Boy, the Kevin James movie Here Comes the Boom, and most recently Ghostbusters (2016 film) starring Melissa McCarthy, Kristen Wiig, Kate McKinnon, and Leslie Jones.

References

Further reading
 1871 Atlas of Massachusetts. by Wall & Gray.  Map of Massachusetts. Map of Middlesex County.
 Dutton, E.P. Chart of Boston Harbor and Massachusetts Bay with Map of Adjacent Country. Published 1867. A good map of roads and rail lines around Everett/South Malden.
 Old USGS maps of Everett.
 History of Middlesex County, Massachusetts,   Volume 1 (A-H),  Volume 2 (L-W) compiled by Samuel Adams Drake, published 1879–1880. 572 and 505 pages.  Everett article by Dudley P. Bailey in volume 1 pages 428–435.
  The History of Malden, Massachusetts, 1633–1785. By Deloraine Pendre Corey, published 1898, 870 pages. Note, Everett was originally South Malden.
 Births, marriages onin Everett Mass 4 Everett  deaths and Deaths in the Town of en49DelorPendre Corey, published 1903.

External links

 Official website
 Everett Public Libraries
 Everett Independent newspaper
 Profile at City Data
 Everett Leader Herald

 
Cities in Massachusetts
Cities in Middlesex County, Massachusetts
Populated places established in 1630
1630 establishments in Massachusetts